Cieneguillas may refer to:

Cieneguillas, Argentina
Cieneguillas, Bolivia
Cieneguillas, Mexico

See also
Cieneguilla